Shirley Ellis (born 1952; married name Morgan) is a Welsh former sportswoman who played cricket as an all-rounder and field hockey for the Welsh national team. 

She appeared in five One Day Internationals (ODIs) for Young England in the 1973 Women's Cricket World Cup. In her first match, she became the first woman cricketer to open both the batting and bowling in an ODI. Overall, she took two wickets and scored 62 runs, with a high score of 30. She played domestic cricket for Sussex and West of England.

Ellis her first appearance for the Welsh hockey team in 1971, aged nineteen. In 1973 she took part in the Welsh Ladies' tour of the West Indies, from which she emerged top scorer with 17 goals.

References

External links
 
 

1952 births
Living people
Date of birth missing (living people)
Place of birth missing (living people)
Welsh women cricketers
Young England women cricketers
Sussex women cricketers
West women cricketers